Wherwell is a village on the River Test in Hampshire, England.  The name may derive from its bubbling springs resulting in the Middle Ages place name “Hwerwyl” noted in AD 955, possibly meaning “kettle springs” or “cauldron springs.” Pronunciation of the name has ranged from “Hurrell” to “Wer-rel” to present-day “Wher-well.”

Before the Dissolution, the parish of Wherwell was in the hands of an important abbey of Benedictine nuns, whose abbess was Lady of the Manor of an area much larger than the existing parish.

The town is associated with the Cockatrice. The story is that the cockatrice terrorised the village until it was imprisoned in the dungeons below Wherwell Priory. A prize of land was offered to anyone who could kill the creature. None were successful, until a man named Green lowered a mirror into the dungeon. The cockatrice battled against its own reflection until exhausted, at which point Green was able to kill it. Today there is an area of land near Wherwell called Green's Acres. For many years a weather vane in the shape of a cockatrice adorned the church of St. Peter and Holy Cross in Wherwell until it was removed to Andover Museum.

Education 

The village is home to a primary school, Wherwell Primary School.

References

External links

Chilbolton and Wherwell Community Website
Wherwell photos, maps and memories
Publications featuring Wherwell
ANY-village for Wherwell

Villages in Hampshire